Daniel Franks may refer to:

 Bubba Franks (born 1978), American football player
 Daniel Franks (BMX rider) (born 1993), New Zealand BMX rider

See also
Daniel Frank (disambiguation)